Semnolius is a genus of South American jumping spiders that was first described by Eugène Louis Simon in 1902.

Species
 it contains six species, found only in Brazil and Argentina:
Semnolius albofasciatus Mello-Leitão, 1941 – Argentina
Semnolius brunneus Mello-Leitão, 1945 – Argentina
Semnolius chrysotrichus Simon, 1902 (type) – Brazil
Semnolius imberbis (Simon, 1902) – Brazil
Semnolius lunatus (Mello-Leitão, 1947) – Brazil
Semnolius rubrolunatus (Mello-Leitão, 1945) – Argentina

References

Salticidae genera
Salticidae
Spiders of Argentina
Spiders of Brazil